Jirdeh (also Romanized as Jīrdeh; also known as Jīrdeh-e Pā‘īn) is a village in Aliyan Rural District, Sardar-e Jangal District, Fuman County, Gilan Province, Iran. At the 2006 census, its population was 239, in 59 families.

References 

Populated places in Fuman County